Cruel Intentions is the compilation soundtrack to the 1999 film of the same name.  The film's soundtrack peaked at #60 on the Billboard 200.

Information
The songs "Push It" by Garbage, "If You Tolerate This Your Children Will Be Next" by Manic Street Preachers, "How Soon Is Now?" by Love Spit Love, "6 Underground" by Sneaker Pimps, and "Cut the Cord" by Pushmonkey were used in promotional spots for the film. None of the promotional songs appear on the soundtrack. Also according to the commentary, The Smashing Pumpkins song "To Sheila" was considered, but the rights couldn't be obtained. Although the song "Lovefool" by The Cardigans was featured in the film, it too was not featured in the soundtrack.

Music composer John Ottman had originally created an entire musical score for the film but it was rejected and Ed Shearmur was hired to compose new music. Ottman's score was moody and sophisticated, but the producers had instead opted for a more pop/rock-oriented soundtrack. Ottman, not wanting to let his hard work go to waste, released his music in an album through Varèse Sarabande called Music Inspired by the Film Cruel Intentions: Suites and Themes from the Scores of John Ottman, which featured 10 tracks of his original score plus tracks from his work on other films and TV shows, including Halloween H20: 20 Years Later, Apt Pupil, and Fantasy Island.

Tracks

There may also be other songs released for different countries such as "Good Morning Baby" by Bic Runga for the Australian market.

Charts
Album

Certifications

References

1990s film soundtrack albums
1999 soundtrack albums
Virgin Records soundtracks